Sensor is the sixth studio album from German synthpop group Camouflage, released on May 26, 2003 by Island Records. It is the band's first album since 1995's Spice Crackers, and the first to feature Oliver Kreyssig since 1989's Methods of Silence. The album charted at #26 in Germany.

Background 
Former band member Oliver Kreyssig had remained in contact with the band following his departure, and through Polydor Music (who had now acquired rights to the band's back catalogue), he began indirectly working with the band on a greatest hits album (Best of Camouflage: We Stroke the Flames) in 1997. He then rejoined the band in 1998, and they began work on their next studio album.

A single, "Thief", was released in July 1999, and it was intended to be the lead single from the new album. However, Virgin indicated that they were not interested in releasing another Camouflage album, resulting in further delays. The band performed a gig in June 2000 in Freiberg, Sweden, their first performance in years.

Recording 
Camouflage recruited three different production teams for the recording of Sensor to produce different results for each recording. Rob Kirwan and the band Toy worked on the album in London, while Gerret Freirichs worked from Hamburg. Heiko Maile also worked on the album from his studio in Stuttgart. The producers each sent completed tracks via the Internet and the band's website.

Following additional delays, Camouflage signed with Polydor in February 2002 and continued work on the album. However, Rob Kirwan and Toy retracted from the project late in 2002, causing more delays to the completion of the album. Nevertheless, following a long period of time, energy, and patience, the album was finally completed in 2003.

Promotion 
Two singles came from the record. The first, "Me and You", was released in April 2003 and reached #53 on the German charts. "I Can't Feel You" was issued in August 2003 and charted at #75 in Germany. The third single "Perfect" was cancelled due to the poor chart performances of the other two singles.

Track listing 
All songs written by Camouflage, except Track 5, written by Christoph Papendieck, Gerret Frerichs, Kim Sanders, Sven Schumacher.

Credits
Co-producer – Heiko Maile (tracks: 1 to 5, 7, 9, 11) 
Guitar – Jörn Heilbutt (tracks: 3 to 5), Volker Hinkel (tracks: 6, 10, 12) 
Mixed By – Ralf C. Mayer (tracks: 6, 10, 12) 
Photography By – Mathias Bothor 
Producer – Heiko Maile (tracks: 6, 8, 10, 12, 13) 
Producer [Additional], Programmed By [Additional] – Andre Winter (tracks: 1 to 5, 7, 9, 11) 
Producer, Mixed By – Humate (tracks: 1 to 5, 7, 9, 11) 
Recorded By – Ronda Ray (alias Heiko Maile) (tracks: 6, 8, 10, 12, 13) 
Written-By – Heiko Maile (tracks: 1 to 4, 6 to 13), Marcus Meyn (tracks: 1 to 4, 6 to 13), Oliver Kreyssig (tracks: 1 to 4, 6 to 13)  
℗ & © 2003 Polydor Island Group, a division of Universal Music GmbH.

References

External links
Official discography
Camouflage Sensor
 NadaBueno - Sensor: Spanish Review

2003 albums
Camouflage (band) albums